The following lists events that happened during 1909 in China.

Incumbents
Emperor: Xuantong Emperor（Empress Dowager Longyu proxy）
Regent: Zaifeng, Prince Chun

Events
Chinese provinces (except Xinjiang) hold elections for the first time, for provincial legislatures and the National Assembly.
 January 2 - The Qing government dismissed Yuan Shikai.

References

 
1900s in China
Years of the 20th century in China